Diego Alfonso Barrios Suárez (born 20 July 1987) is a Paraguayan footballer who currently plays for Colchagua as striker.

Club career

Cobreloa
On 19 July 2011, it was confirmed that by the club's president Javier Maureira that Barrios was signed by Cobreloa for replace to Alexander Corro, who was injured.

Finally, the player finished as a starter and scored 9 in 25 appearances.

References

External links
 
 

1987 births
Living people
Paraguayan footballers
Paraguayan expatriate footballers
Club y Biblioteca Ramón Santamarina footballers
Deportivo Morón footballers
Cobreloa footballers
Everton de Viña del Mar footballers
Chilean Primera División players
Expatriate footballers in Chile
Expatriate footballers in Argentina
Estudiantes de Río Cuarto footballers
Association football forwards